Simon Mainwaring is a branding expert and author of We First: How Brands and Consumers Use Social Media to Build a Better World (Palgrave Macmillan 2011) and Lead With We: The Business Revolution that Will Save Our Future (Matt Holt/BenBella 2021). He is the founder and CEO of Culver City, California-based We First Inc., a brand consultancy.

Background 
Prior to founding We First, Manwaring was creative director at advertising agencies such as Saatchi & Saatchi, Wieden & Kennedy, and Ogilvy working with clients like Motorala, Nike, and Toyota. His work is mentioned in Cutting Edge Advertising by Jim Aitchison.

We First: How Brands & Consumers Use Social Media to Build a Better World  
The book We First was released on June 7, 2011. Publishers Weekly says the book  "proposes cooperation between governments, philanthropies, and capitalist corporations to achieve meaningful social transformation 

We First was a New York Times, Wall Street Journal and Amazon best seller. Strategy+business named it "Best Business Marketing Book of 2011" saying, "It’s the best marketing book of the year because anyone who reads it will begin to question how his or her company does business, and that’s the initial step to change."

We First, Inc. 
Mainwaring is the founder and CEO of We First, Inc., a Culver City-based creative consultancy for brands. Clients include brands such as TOMS, Timberland, VF Corporation, SAP, Avery Dennison, VSP Global, Coca-Cola, Clif Bar, The Coffee Bean & Tea Leaf, Wrangler, and Reef. The firm is a certified B Corporation.

References

External links 
Website

1967 births
American bloggers
Businesspeople from California
Living people
Writers from California
American public relations people
American marketing people
Wieden+Kennedy people
Branding consultants
American chief executives